Two Savory baronetcies, both now extinct, were created in 1890 and 1891 respectively.

The Savory baronetcy, of The Woodlands, Hollybush Hill, Stoke Poges, Buckinghamshire, was created in the Baronetage of the United Kingdom on 24 March 1890 for surgeon William Scovell Savory. The second baronet, Sir Borradaile Savory, was rector of St Bartholomew-the-Great and the third baronet, Sir William Borradaile Savory, High Sheriff of Buckinghamshire for 1923.

The Savory baronetcy, of Buckhurst Park, Berkshire, was created 14 September 1891 in the Baronetage of the United Kingdom for Joseph Savory, Sheriff of London for 1882, Lord Mayor of London for 1890 and MP for Appleby from 1892 to 1900.

Savory baronets, of The Woodlands, Bucks (1890)
Sir William Scovell Savory, 1st Baronet (1826–1895)
The Rev. Sir Borradaile Savory, 2nd Baronet (1855–1906)
Sir William Borradaile Savory, 3rd Baronet (1882–1961) Baronetcy extinct on his death.

Savory baronets, of Buckhurst Park, Berks (1891)

Sir Joseph Savory, 1st Baronet (1843–1921) Lord Mayor of London, 1890 and MP for Appleby 1892–1900. Baronetcy extinct on his death.

References

 

Extinct baronetcies in the Baronetage of the United Kingdom